Benjaminas Viluckis (March 20, 1961 – 19 September 2017) was a male hammer thrower from Lithuania, who competed  for his native country at the 1992 Summer Olympics in Barcelona, Spain. He set his personal best (82.24 metres) on August 21, 1986 at a meet in Klaipėda. That mark is still the national record.

Achievements

References

sports-reference

1961 births
2017 deaths
Lithuanian male hammer throwers
Athletes (track and field) at the 1992 Summer Olympics
Olympic athletes of Lithuania
Goodwill Games medalists in athletics
Competitors at the 1986 Goodwill Games